is a private university located in the city of Akita, Akita Prefecture, Japan.

Facilities

Undergraduate
School of Nursing
 Department of Nursing

Graduate
Graduate School of Nursing

History
The Akita branch of the Japanese Red Cross was established in 1896, with a hospital and nurse training school in 1914. It was renamed the Akita Red Cross Nursing School in 1976. The Japanese Red Cross Junior College of Akita was opened in 1996, but the four-year college was closed in March 1998. However, the four-year school reopened in April 2009 as the Japanese Red Cross Akita College of Nursing. A graduate program was established in 2011.

References

External links
  

Educational institutions established in 2009
Private universities and colleges in Japan
Universities and colleges in Akita Prefecture
2009 establishments in Japan
Nursing schools in Japan
Buildings and structures in Akita (city)